Mediaset TGcom24 is a conservative Italian 24-hour all-news television channel operated by Mediaset and owned by MFE - MediaForEurope, started in 2011 and broadcast on digital terrestrial television and on the Sky Italia satellite platform in Italy. This channel runs live at 6-1 am.

See also
 Television in Italy
 Digital terrestrial television in Italy
 Mediaset
 TGCOM

References

External links
 

Free-to-air
Television channels in Italy
24-hour television news channels in Italy
Italian-language television stations
Television channels and stations established in 2011
Conservative media